Melanthia alaudaria is a moth of the family Geometridae. It has a local distribution in central Europe.

The wingspan is 18–24 mm. Adults are on wing from the end of May to the beginning of July.

The larvae feed on the leaves of Clematis species. Larvae can be found from July to August. Pupation takes place on the ground. The species overwinters in the pupal stage.

References

External links

Lepiforum.de
schmetterlinge-deutschlands.de

Moths described in 1846
Melanthiini
Moths of Europe
Taxa named by Christian Friedrich Freyer